A neighborhood association (NA) is a group of residents or property owners who advocate to organize activities within a neighborhood. An association may have elected leaders and voluntary dues.

Some neighborhood associations in the United States are incorporated, may be recognized by the Internal Revenue Service as 501(c)(4) nonprofit organization, and may enjoy freedom from taxation from their home state.

The term neighborhood association is sometimes incorrectly used instead of homeowners association. But neighborhood associations are not homeowners associations - groups of property owners with the legal authority to enforce rules and regulations that focus on restrictions and building and safety issues. A neighborhood association is a group of neighbors and business owners who work together for changes and improvements such as neighborhood safety, beautification and social activities. They reinforce rules and regulations through education, peer pressure and by looking out for each other.  Some key differences include:
 HOA membership is mandatory generally through rules tied to the ownership of property like deed restrictions. Neighborhood association membership is voluntary or informal.
 HOAs often own and maintain common property, such as recreational facilities, parks, and roads, whereas neighborhood associations are focused on general advocacy and community events.

The rules for formation of a neighborhood association in the United States are sometimes regulated at the city or state level.

Neighborhood councils are also a different type of entity within a city, whose officers are generally elected, are composed of various neighborhood associations and, as such, may be subject to limitations and special rules set up by the council.

Neighborhood associations are more likely to be formed in older, established neighborhoods, especially those that predate HOAs. HOAs are generally established at the time a residential neighborhood is built and sold.  Sometimes older established neighborhoods form an HOA to help regulate rules and standards.

In some cases, neighborhood associations exist simultaneously with HOAs, and each may not encompass identical boundaries. In one example, newer infill neighborhoods built decades after the original, surrounding HOA-less neighborhood may have its own HOA but also be within the boundaries of a NA.

In the United Kingdom, it is known as a residents' association.

Grassroots and straddler organizations
While neighborhood associations in the United States often function in a similar manner, other areas of the world demonstrate different forms of neighborhood associations.  These may share basic characteristics with traditional grassroots organizations but yet often remain distinctly different.  Benjamin Read refers to this variety of organizations as "straddlers for their spanning of the state-society divide."  Neighborhood Associations in terms of grassroots organizations compared to straddler organizations can be distinguished by the following characteristics:

Grassroots
 Ultra local level
 Citizens’ organizations
 Ideas are authentic & pure
 Driven by community volunteers
 Develop naturally & spontaneously
 Autonomous from government and politics

Neighborhood-based Straddler organizations
 East & Southeast Asia
 Extensive grassroots presence
 Engage widespread participation
 Linked to state rather than independent of it
 Governments actively shape their citizens' lives

To expand on the variety of global neighborhood associations present, an example can be used from certain NAs in Asia.

Neighborhood association frameworks in Asia
There exists four general frameworks to understanding how a local organization, such as a neighborhood association, may straddle the state-society realm.  They are:
 Civil Society Theory – Local citizens' groups are autonomous from government           
 Mass organizations – Ultimate government control; ruling party dominates specific sectors of society
 Corporatism – State structuring of societal interests
 State-Society Synergy- Government and communities partner to enhance each other's efforts

The relationship between the states and the various forms of neighborhood association may also be identified by its level of statism.  Mass organizations would be considered the most statist, where the local associations are closely linked to the state.   The Civil Society theory is considered the least statist and here the local associations are extremely self-reliant.  Between the most and least statist points are corporatist and state-society synergy; they operate with government and depend on its sponsorship but remain free from direct control. China, Singapore, Japan, Taiwan, Indonesia, and Thailand provide examples of how the four frameworks and statism levels play a role in guiding the overall purpose and ultimate goal of the neighborhood-based organizations in each county.

See also
 Community association
 Homeowners association
 Neighborhood
 Neighborhood Watch
 Community league
 Comparison of Home Owners' and Civic Associations
 Chōnaikai

References

Neighborhood associations

ja:町内会